Advait Mat or Paramhans Advait Mat is a cluster of panths (groups of disciples) in northern India. It was founded by Shri Swami Advaitanand Ji Maharaj (1846-1919) who is also known as Paramhans Dyal Ji Maharaj. He declared Swami Swarupanand Ji Maharaj ( also known as Shri Nangli Niwasi Bhagwan Ji) as his spiritual successor. Swami Swarupanand Ji Maharaj founded more than 300 ashrams with the purpose of disseminating his master's teachings. Swami Swarupanand Ji Maharaj had initiated more than thousand of his disciples into the sanyas. Many of his disciples went on to establish spiritual institutions to spread the same knowledge.

The ashrams founded by Shri Paramahans Dyal Ji were called Krishna Dwaras. The ashrams with the name Adwait-Swarup Ashram, Paramhans Satyarthi Dham, Shri Anandpur Satsang Ashram are also related to him and Shri Paramhans Advait Mat.

Reportedly, they perceive themselves to be originating from Totapuri in the 18th century, who was the guru of Ramakrishna as well.

All gurus
 Shri pratham paadshahi ji Shri Shri 108 Shri Swami Advaitanand Ji Maharaj (Shri Paramhans Dayal ji)
Born- 5th April, 1846,Chhapra, Bihar. 
Demise- 10 July, 1919.
 Shri dvitiya paadshahi ji Shri Shri 108  Swarupanand Ji Maharaj
Born- 1 Feb, 1884
Accession- 20 Oct, 1919
Demise- 9 Apr, 1936

 Shri tritiya paadshahi ji Shri Shri 108  Swami Vairagyanand Ji Maharaj
 Shri chaturth paadshahi ji Shri Shri 108  Swami Beantanand Ji Maharaj
 Shri pancham paadshahi ji Shri Shri 108 Swami Darshan Poornanand Ji Maharaj
 Shri shashtam paadshahi ji Shri Shri 108  Swami Vichar Poornanand Ji Maharaj

Main spiritual centre

The largest and the main organization established by the spiritual master is "Shri Anandpur Dham" In Nethai,Madhya Pradesh comprising many smaller trusts in nearby areas. 
Coordinates  
The Ashram of Anandpur Dham is also home to current spiritual master.

Other Organisations

 Shri Anandpur Satsang Ashram
 Sar Shabd Mission (Adwait Swaroop Ashram)
 Shri Anandpur Ashram ( Hakkal, Jammu) 
 Paramhans Satyarthi Mission

Shri Prayagdham Trust (Pune, Maharashtra)
 Shri Sant Nagar (Rajasthan)

See also
 Contemporary Sant Mat movements

References

Further reading
 Shri Paramhans Advait Mat: A Life Sketch of the Illustrious Master of the Mat., Shri Anandpur Trust (1975) WorldCat

 
Contemporary Sant Mat